is the twenty-sixth studio album by Japanese heavy metal band Loudness, released on June 3, 2014. A US mix of the album was released on October 7, 2015, in which the songs were remixed, and the album cover shows a blue-and-white rising sun design, instead of the traditional red-and-white. The tracks "Nourishment of the Wind" and "Got to Be Strong" are only released on the Japanese edition of the album, while "Rock Will Never Die" is only released on the US edition.

Track listing

2015 U.S. Mix release

Personnel
Loudness
Minoru Niihara – vocals
Akira Takasaki – guitars
Masayoshi Yamashita – bass
Masayuki Suzuki – drums

Production
Masatoshi Sakimoto - engineer, mixing
Kohki Meno - engineer
Hiorshi Ishida, Kento Imagawa, Nobuhiro Kawashima, Takanari Shibuchi - assistant engineers
Brian "Big Bass" Gardner - mastering at Bernie Grundman Mastering, Los Angeles
Yoshichika Kuriyama - additional programming, sound effects
Kimitaka Kato, Shunji Inoue - supervisors

References

Loudness (band) albums
2014 albums
Universal Music Group albums